Bernard Henri Maris (23 September 19467 January 2015), also known as "Oncle Bernard", was a French economist, writer and journalist who was also a shareholder in Charlie Hebdo magazine. He was murdered on 7 January 2015, during the shooting at the headquarters of the magazine in Paris.

Biography

Studies and academic career
After graduating from Sciences Po Toulouse in 1968, Bernard Maris earned a doctorate in economics at the University of Toulouse I in 1975 with a thesis entitled La distribution personnelle des revenus: une approche théorique dans le cadre de la croissance équilibrée ("The personal distribution of income: A theoretical approach to balanced growth"), prepared under the direction of Jean Vincens. He taught as an assistant professor then from 1984 on as a senior lecturer at the University of Toulouse I. In September 1994 he earned his full professorship (Professeur des Universités) through the Agrégation d'Économie Générale (a competitive examination on the subject of General Economic Science)  at the Institut d'Études Politiques [Institute of Political Science] in Toulouse.

At the time of his death, he was a professor at the Institute of European studies of the University of Paris-VIII. He also taught microeconomics at the University of Iowa in the United States and the Central Bank of Peru.

Journalism
Bernard Maris wrote for various journals: Marianne, Le Nouvel Observateur, Le Figaro Magazine, Le Monde and Charlie Hebdo, in which he used the pen name "Oncle Bernard". At Charlie Hebdo, he was the Deputy Editorial Director until 2008. As its founder, during the rebirth of the title in 1992, he was an 11% shareholder.

On the radio, Bernard Maris had a weekly column entitled J'ai tout compris à l'économie, each Saturday on France Inter, and took part each Friday in a debate on topical economic issues with the economic journalist of Les Échos, Dominique Seux, from 7:50.

He also presented on television, on the i-Télé channel, where he participated as a columnist in Y'a pas que le CAC. There he commented with another professor of Economics, Philippe Chalmin (close to the neoclassical school), on the economic news until June 2009. He also regularly appeared on the programme C dans l'air on France 5.

Associations and political life
Bernard Maris was often presented as alter-globalization, because of his earlier participation with the Scientific Council of ATTAC Association for the Taxation of Financial Transactions and for Citizens' Action.

He lived in the 16th arrondissement of Paris, and was a candidate in 2002 at the city-council elections of the 10th arrondissement of Paris for The Greens. He was also a candidate for the CFDT in the 2009 elections for the Commission de la carte d'identité des journalistes professionnels.

Novelist
Bernard Maris published several novels including L'enfant qui voulait être muet, and was awarded the Leclerc's booksellers award in 2003.

Family
He was married to Sylvie Genevoix, a journalist and a former member of the CSA, who died on 20 September 2012. She was Maurice Genevoix's daughter.

Freemasonry
Bernard Maris was initiated at Roger Leray lodge in Paris (Grand Orient de France) in 2008.

Death 
Maris was killed, along with seven of his colleagues, two police officers, and two others on 7 January 2015 in the Charlie Hebdo shooting when armed gunmen stormed the Charlie Hebdo newspaper offices in Paris.

Work in economics
Maris was a great admirer of John Maynard Keynes, to whom he dedicated a book, Keynes ou l'économiste citoyen, and has published many popular economic books. He is known, amongst others, by titles such as Ah Dieu! Que la guerre économique est jolie! (1998), Lettre ouverte aux gourous de l'économie qui nous prennent pour des imbéciles (1999) and La Bourse ou la vie (2000).

With incisive style, he tried to explain the nature and the interests of the real economy, unveiling its negative aspects, but also highlighting concepts and alternatives such as the gratuity, the gift economy and basic income, which were, in his eyes, of significance.

Le Nouvel Économiste magazine assigned him the title of "Best Economist of the Year", in 1995.

Bank of France
On 21 December 2011, Jean-Pierre Bel, president of the Senate, appointed him a member of the General Council of the Banque de France.

Publications

Economics

Analyses

Novels

Filmography
2008: Encirclement by Richard Brouillette
2010: Film Socialisme by Jean-Luc Godard

See also
List of journalists killed in Europe

References

External links 
 

1946 births
2015 deaths
Assassinated French journalists
Terrorism deaths in France
20th-century French novelists
21st-century French novelists
University of Toulouse alumni
Academic staff of Paris 8 University Vincennes-Saint-Denis
Academic staff of the University of Paris
University of Iowa faculty
20th-century  French  economists
21st-century  French economists
Academic staff of the University of Toulouse
Victims of the Charlie Hebdo shooting
French Freemasons
Charlie Hebdo people
French male novelists